Ercole Setti (c.1530–1618) was an Italian engraver of the late-Renaissance period.

Setti was born in Modena.  His pen-and-ink drawings show a fine draughtsmanship without requiring cross-hatching. Like the later Gaetano Zompini, he made a series of engravings of types of merchants of his time.

References
Drawings by Ercole Setti, by Walter Vitzthum. The Burlington Magazine, 1955, pages 252–254.

Italian engravers
Artists from Modena
1530s births
1618 deaths